Jimmy Gaillard (1916–1985) was a French actor. He began his film career in 1924 as a child actor.

Selected filmography
 Peach Skin (1929)
 Heart of Paris (1932)
 Whirlwind of Paris (1939)
 Nightclub Hostess (1939)
 Prince Charming (1942)
 Mademoiselle Béatrice (1943)
 Arlette and Love (1943)
 Son of France (1946)
 Gringalet (1946)
 The White Night (1948)
Judicial Error (1948)
 Life Is a Game (1951)
 The Fighting Drummer (1953)

References

Bibliography
 Sandy Flitterman-Lewis. To Desire Differently: Feminism and the French Cinema. University of Illinois Press, 1990.

External links

1916 births
1985 deaths
French male film actors
French male silent film actors
20th-century French male actors
Male actors from Lyon